The Oregon Transfer Company Building is an historic building in Portland, Oregon. Completed during 1910–1911, the structure is part of the Portland Thirteenth Avenue Historic District, which is listed on the National Register of Historic Places.

External links
 

Buildings and structures in Portland, Oregon
Pearl District, Portland, Oregon